Michel Pélieu (born 26 June 1946) is a French politician.

Biography 
A member of the Radical Left Party (PRG), Pélieu was elected mayor of Loudenvielle from 1977 to 2011. In 1985, he became general counsel of the canton of Bordères-Louron, in Hautes-Pyrénées.

Since the French senate elections in 2001, he has been the deputy of François Fortassin.

During the local elections of 2011, he was elected with 70% of votes in the canton of Bordères-Louron and ran for the presidency of the General Council, facing past president Josette Durrieu. After a tight turn, Pélieu became chairman of the General Council of the Pyrénées.

At the departmental elections of 2015, partnering with Maryse Beyrié (PS), they earned 75.13% of the vote in the canton of Neste, Aure, and Louron. Pélieu was re-elected head of the department 31-3.

Distinctions 
 Legion of Honour in April 2014

Notes and references

1946 births
Living people
Officiers of the Légion d'honneur
Radical Party of the Left politicians
Hautes-Pyrénées
Senators of Hautes-Pyrénées